Guarlford is a village and civil parish in the Malvern Hills district in the county of Worcestershire, England.

It is situated between the settlements of Barnards Green and Rhydd approximately three kilometres (two miles) east of Great Malvern, the town centre of Malvern. The village is compact, and has a parish church, St Mary's; the Church of England parish includes Madresfield village. Guarlford is in the administrative area of Malvern Hills District Council and is part of the informal region known as The Malverns.

History

Settlements in  Guarlford have existed for around 4,000 years. and have been known as Garford (Lay Subsidy Rolls 1275), Gerleford (Lay Subsidy Rolls 1333), Garleford (Valor Ecclesiasticus 1535), Galvert (Map of Worcestershire 1820), and Galfords (Ordnance Survey 1830). 

Guarlford is one of the earliest inhabited places in the Malvern area and shows evidence of Neolithic activity with crop marks dating from a period that extends from 2350 BC to 409 AD. The Hwicce, an Anglo-Saxon tribe cleared land which may be the site of the existing Guarlford Court.

The first parish council was established in December 1894 according to a new Local Government act, and covered much of eastern Malvern including parts of Great  Malvern, Pickersleigh, Poolbrook, Barnards Green, Hall Green, and Sherrards Green. In 1934 following a review, the boundaries were changed, and those areas came under the control of the Malvern council.

During World War II a radio listening post was set up in Rectory Lane by the Telecommunications Research Establishment (TRE) to monitor enemy communications, which was instrumental in locating the German V-2 rocket base in Peenemünde that was subsequently bombed by the RAF in Operation Crossbow.

References

External links

 Guarlford History Project
 Parish of Guarlford Home Page

Villages in Worcestershire
Civil parishes in Worcestershire
Malvern, Worcestershire